Juan Carlos Vellido (born March 18, 1968) is a Spanish actor.

Vellido was born in Barcelona, Spain. His career is divided between cinema, theater and television. Among his most recent film appearances were as the protagonist of (No somos nadie) and has worked with directors like Guillermo del Toro (El espinazo del diablo), María Ripoll (Utopía) and Manuel Huerga (Salvador).

Vellido has also published two literary works: Escorzos and El hombre que vivía en una pecera both published by Ediciones Martínez Roca.

Vellido appeared in Pirates of the Caribbean: On Stranger Tides, along with three other fellow Spanish actors Astrid Berges-Frisbey, Óscar Jaenada and Penélope Cruz.

Filmography

References 

1968 births
Living people
Spanish male film actors
Spanish male stage actors
Spanish male telenovela actors
Male actors from Barcelona
Spanish male writers